The Virginia Resolves were a series of resolutions passed on May 29, 1765, by the Virginia House  of Burgesses in response to the Stamp Act of 1765, which had imposed a tax on the British colonies in North America requiring that material be printed on paper made in London which carried an embossed revenue stamp. The act had been passed by the Parliament of Great Britain to help pay off some of its debt from its various wars, including the French and Indian War fought in part to protect the American colonies. 

The resolves claimed that in accordance with long established British law, Virginia was subject to taxation only by a parliamentary assembly to which Virginians themselves elected representatives. Since no colonial representatives were elected to Parliament, the only assembly legally allowed to raise taxes would be the Virginia General Assembly.

Similarly angered, legislatures in nine other colonies later sent delegates to Stamp Act Congress in New York (October 9–25, 1765) to devise a unified protest against the tax. Virginia was not represented at the meeting as the General Assembly was prevented from participating by Lieutenant Governor of Virginia Francis Fauquier.

Origin 

On May 29, 1765, Patrick Henry made one of his famous speeches before the Virginia House of Burgesses to encourage the passage of the resolutions.  Henry said "Caesar had his Brutus, Charles I his Cromwell, and George III... (Henry was interrupted by cries from the opposition)… may profit by their example. If this be treason, make                                                       the most of it."  When Patrick Henry paused after the vibrant portion of the speech, Speaker John Robinson stood and shouted, "Treason! Treason!". Patrick Henry at this point issued a semi-apology.

Peyton Randolph later told his young cousin Thomas Jefferson who was standing in the doorways of the House quite frequently. "By God, I would have given 500 guineas for a single vote".

The Burgesses generally voted along geographic lines with eastern Virginians opposing the resolves and central Virginians supporting them. Patrick Henry left Williamsburg, Virginia that night fearing the powerful members of the House would harass him with a warrant.

The next day, with Patrick Henry gone and most conservative assembly members back in session, the assembly again set a vote with conservatives trying to have the Resolves struck from the record. However Henry's supporters managed to preserve the first four resolutions with only the more radical 5th Resolution being struck.

In late June the Newport Mercury was the first newspaper to publish the Virginia Resolves to the general public with several other newspapers following soon after. Notably, none of the newspapers drew on the official House records, and as a result the published resolutions included not only the four ratified resolutions but also the, already removed, 5th resolution. In fact the newspapers even went so far to include a 6th and 7th resolution, the origin of which is still disputed. Some sources quote those two articles as being part of Henry's original manuscript while others argue that their origin is unknown.

A direct result of the publishing of the Virginia Resolves was a growing public anger over the Stamp Act and according to several contemporary sources the Resolves were responsible for inciting the Stamp Act Riots. Governor Thomas Hutchinson of Massachusetts stated that "Nothing extravagant appeared in the papers till an account was received of the Virginia Resolves."  Later Edmund Burke linked the resolves with the beginning of the opposition to the Stamp Act that would contribute to the American Revolution.

Text of the Virginia Resolves
The original text of the Virginia Resolves as adopted by the House of Burgesses on May 29, 1765 was as follows:

Additional resolutions

When the Virginia Resolves were first published in colonial newspapers the articles cited not only the four officially adopted resolutions but also included the revoked fifth resolve plus two additional resolutions:

Resolved, That his majesty's liege people, the inhabitants of this colony, are not bound to yield obedience to any law or ordinance whatsoever designed to impose any taxation whatsoever upon them, other than the laws and ordinances of the general assembly aforesaid.

Resolved, That any person who shall by speaking or writing maintain that any person or persons other than the general assembly of this colony have any right or power to impose or lay any taxation whatsoever on the people here shall be deemed an enemy to this his majesty's colony.
 
These two resolutions were never passed by the House of Burgesses, and it is not known for certain who authored them, although some sources claim that they were part of the original draft by Patrick Henry

See also
 No taxation without representation
 Social contract

References

External links
Text of the Virginia Resolves

1765 in the Thirteen Colonies
Virginia in the American Revolution
1765 in Virginia
1765 documents
Patrick Henry